Cneorum is a genus of flowering plants in the rue or citrus family Rutaceae. The two species are native to Europe and the Canary Islands.

Species
, Plants of the World Online accepted the following two species:
Cneorum pulverulentum Vent.
Cneorum tricoccon L.

See also 
 List of Rutaceae genera

References

External links 
 
 

Cneoroideae
Rutaceae genera